Dunantina Rural LLG is a local-level government (LLG) of Eastern Highlands Province, Papua New Guinea.

Wards
01. Lihona
02. Kuyahapa
03. Kesevaka(Zagafonave) No 2
04. Kesevaka No 1
05. Haguragave
06. Kiviringka
07. Herave
08. Kemenave

References

Local-level governments of Eastern Highlands Province